You're Killing Me is an upcoming American horror thriller film directed by Beth Hanna and Jerren Lauder and written by Walker Hare and Brad Martocello. The film stars McKaley Miller, Anne Heche, and Dermot Mulroney. Produced by Iris Indie International, it is set to be released by Quiver Distribution on April 7, 2023.

Cast 
 McKaley Miller as Eden
 Anne Heche
 Dermot Mulroney

Production 
The film was announced by Deadline Hollywood in 2022, that Anne Heche, Dermot Mulroney, and McKaley Miller is set to star in the film which was formerly titled "Full Ride" directed by Jerren Lauder and Beth Hanna distributed by Quiver Distribution which filming wraps in Georgia. Heche died from a car accident in August 2022, while the film was in post-production.

Release 
The film is scheduled to be released in select theaters and on Video on demand on April 7, 2023.

References

External links 
 

Horror films
2023 films